Kosmos 230 ( meaning Cosmos 230), also known as DS-U3-S No.2, was a satellite which was launched by the Soviet Union in 1968 as part of the Dnepropetrovsk Sputnik programme. It was a  spacecraft, which was built by the Yuzhnoye Design Bureau, and was used to conduct multispectral imaging of the Sun.

Kosmos 230 was launched from Site 86/4 at Kapustin Yar, aboard a Kosmos-2I 63SM carrier rocket. The launch occurred at 06:59:50 UTC on 5 July 1968, and resulted in the successful insertion of the satellite into a low Earth orbit. Upon reaching orbit, the satellite was assigned its Kosmos designation, and received the International Designator 1968-056A. The North American Air Defense Command assigned it the catalogue number 03308.

Kosmos 230 was the second of two DS-U3-S satellites to be launched, after Kosmos 166.

See also

1968 in spaceflight

References

Spacecraft launched in 1968
Kosmos satellites
Dnepropetrovsk Sputnik program